Raj or RAJ may refer to:

Indian history 
 British Raj, the British rule in India from 1858 to 1947 (the territory sometimes being informally called the Indian Empire)
 Company Raj, the British East India Company rule in the Indian subcontinent
 Licence Raj, the Indian system of elaborate licences, regulations and accompanying red tape
 Mafia Raj, where public property and funds are controlled by a criminalised nexus of politicians and business interests

Places 
 Raj, Masovian Voivodeship, east-central Poland
 Raj, Pomeranian Voivodeship, north Poland
 Raj, Warmian-Masurian Voivodeship, north Poland
 Ráj, a village in the Czech Republic
 Raj, the Hungarian name for Brazii Commune, Arad County, Romania

People and fictional characters 
 Raj (name), including a list of people and fictional characters with the name
 Raj caste, a Hindu caste in India and Pakistan

Other 
 Raj Comics, Indian comic book publisher
 Raj TV or RAJ, Tamil channel, Chennai, India
 Raj–Koti, a pair of composers and musicians in the Telugu film industry
 Raj Engineering College, Jodhpur, Rajasthan, India
 raj, the ISO 639-2 and -3 codes for the Rajasthani language
 Raj (paradise), Polish album by Przemysław Gintrowski
 Rajkot Airport IATA code
 Russian State University of Justice, formerly known as the Russian Academy of Justice (RAJ)

See also 
Raja (disambiguation)